The ruddy treeshrew (Tupaia splendidula) is a treeshrew species in the family Tupaiidae. It is endemic to Borneo, the Natuna Islands and the Anambas Islands.

Habitat and threats 

The ruddy treeshrew occurs in the forests of Indonesia. It lives at lower elevations, never occurring over 500 meters above sea level. Although listed as Least Concern, the ruddy treeshrew is still threatened by habitat loss, due to causes such as logging. Due to this, its population is slowly decreasing.

Subspecies 

The ruddy treeshrew has 5 subspecies, widely distributed throughout Indonesia:

 T. splendidula carimatae Miller, 1906 (Karimata Islands)
 T. splendidula lucida Thomas and Hartert, 1895 (Laut Island)
 T. splendidula natunae Lyon, 1911 (Natuna Besar)
 T. splendidula riabus Lyon, 1913 (Anambas Islands)
 T. splendidula splendidula Gray, 1865 (Southern Borneo)

References

Treeshrews
Mammals of Indonesia
Mammals described in 1865
Taxa named by John Edward Gray
Taxonomy articles created by Polbot